Wingett Run is a stream in the U.S. state of Ohio. It is a tributary to the Little Muskingum River.

The stream was named after Jacob Wingett, who owned land near the mouth of Wingett Run in the 1830s.

References

Rivers of Monroe County, Ohio
Rivers of Washington County, Ohio
Rivers of Ohio